Portrush Road is a major arterial route through the eastern suburbs of Adelaide, the capital of South Australia. This name covers many consecutive streets and is not widely known to most drivers except for the southernmost section, as the entire allocation is still best known as by the names of its constituent parts: Hampstead Road, Taunton Road, Ascot Avenue, Lower Portrush Road, and Portrush Road proper. This article will deal with the entire length of the corridor for sake of completion, as well to avoid confusion between declarations. Portrush Road (including all its constituent roads) is designated route A17.

Route
The Portrush Road corridor runs north–south through Adelaide's eastern and south-eastern suburbs, to the foot of the Adelaide Hills at its southern end. From its intersection with Grand Junction Road in Northfield, it runs south as Hampstead Road through to Manningham, where it turns southeast into Taunton Road to intersect with North East Road, changing name to Ascot Avenue and continuing southeast, crossing the River Torrens and changing name again to Lower Portrush Road, before intersecting with Payneham Road. It continues south as Portrush Road through Adelaide's inner eastern suburbs to eventually terminate with the western end of the South Eastern Freeway in Glen Osmond.

Portrush road carries approximately 36,000 vehicles per day, including heavy freight trucks. It is an authorised route for trucks up to  B-double and  vehicle carrier size. Along with Grand Junction Road, Portrush Road constitutes a major heavy road transport route through suburban Adelaide from Port Adelaide to the South East of South Australia and the adjacent state of Victoria.

History
Portrush Road was named by Nathaniel A. Knox after Portrush in Northern Ireland. Knox owned land near the intersection with Greenhill Road, in the area now occupied by the suburbs of Glenunga and Glenside.

In a 1949 street directory, the southern end of Portrush Road had its current route to Kensington Road. North of Kensington Road, it took the name Kensington Terrace, then Wellington Road north of the Magill Road intersection to Payneham Road. What is now Lower Portrush Road (including the bridge over the River Torrens) did not exist at all. Ascot Avenue was a minor street running off of North East Road which did not exactly line up with Taunton Road on the other side of North East Road. The nearest bridge over the River Torrens was the Felixstow Bridge on Felixstow Road, which is now O.G. Road. Lower Portrush Road and the bridge across the Torrens was opened in November 1970.

Had the Metropolitan Adelaide Transport Study of the 1960s progressed, a Hills Freeway would have been constructed to link the South Eastern Freeway to the Port of Adelaide. This would have subsequently removed the freight that utilises Portrush Road today.

Major intersections

See also

References 

City of Burnside
Roads in Adelaide
Freeways and highways in Adelaide